Sri Parashakthi Kshetra(Kannada:ಶ್ರೀ ಪರಾಶಕ್ತಿ ಕ್ಷೇತ್ರ, ಮಡ್ಯಾರು), is temple complex at Madyar, Kotekar. Madyar, located around 20 km from Mangalore, the port city of Karnataka, India is a transcendent land sanctified by divine sannidhyas. It is a unique temple in the whole of South India wherein Goddess Vaishnavi of the Himalayas is worshiped as the presiding deity.

Temple is built under the able directions of Sri Narendranath Yogeshwareshar Swami of Sri Guru Parashakthi Mutt- Sri Parashakthi Kshetra, Marakada. Temple is surrounded by greenery and a beautiful lake.

Sri Parashakthi Kshetra is located almost 30 km from Mangalore International Airport and 20 km from Mangalore Railway Station.

List of Temples 
List of temples in Tulu Nadu

References

External links
 

Hindu temples in Dakshina Kannada district